Pond Eddy is an unincorporated community in Shohola Township, Pike County, Pennsylvania, United States.

The Pond Eddy Bridge, which is listed on the National Register of Historic Places, is located in Pond Eddy. The bridge crosses the Delaware River and connects the community to Lumberland, New York. As Pond Eddy has no road links to the rest of Pennsylvania, residents wishing to drive to other parts of the state must cross the bridge into New York first.

See also
Border irregularities of the United States

References

Unincorporated communities in Pike County, Pennsylvania
Unincorporated communities in Pennsylvania